James Wellington Truran Jr. (born July 12, 1940, Brewster, New York – March 5, 2022) was an American physicist, known for his research in nuclear astrophysics.

Biography
Truran graduated in 1961 with a bachelor's degree from Cornell University. In 1966 he received his PhD in physics from Yale University. His PhD thesis entitled Thermonuclear reactions in supernova shock waves was supervised by Alastair Cameron. As a postdoc Truran was from 1965 to 1967 a research associate at NASA's Goddard Institute for Space Studies. At the physics department of Yeshiva University he was from 1967 to 1970 an assistant professor, from 1970 to 1972 an associate professor, and from 1972 to 1973 a full professor. For the academic year 1968–1969 he was a research fellow in physics at California Institute of Technology. From 1973 to 1991 he was a full professor of astronomy at the University of Illinois Urbana-Champaign. For the academic year 1979–1980 he was a Guggenheim Fellow and held a visiting position at the Institute of Astronomy, Cambridge. With the aid of a Humboldt Research Award he spent the academic year 1986–1987 at the Max Planck Institute for Astrophysics. In 1991 he became a professor in the department of astronomy and astrophysics at the University of Chicago, where he retired as professor emeritus.

He did important research on "novae, supernovae, nucleosynthesis, and galactic chemical evolution through the application of nuclear physics to astrophysics." His Ph.D. thesis and subsequent research led to accurate prediction of the production of the 56Ni in Type Ia supernovae. Radioactive decay of 56Ni through 56Co to 56Fe produces high-energy photons, which dominate the energy output of Type Ia supernova ejecta at intermediate to late times.

Truran's research includes s-processes in stars, carbon explosion models of Type Ia supernovae, and r-processes in metal-poor stars. He was involved in the development of the FLASH simulation code for thermonuclear supernova explosions.

He was elected in 1987 a fellow of the American Physical Society and in 1995 a fellow of the American Academy of Arts and Sciences. From 1985 to 1988 he was the vice president of the board of trustees of the Aspen Center for Physics.

Truran was a member of the AURA "HST and Beyond" Committee, which in 2017 received the Carl Sagan Memorial Award. He received in 2020 the Laboratory Astrophysics Prize of the American Astronomical Society's Laboratory Astrophysics Division (LAD) "for his theoretical work on early star formation and the nucleosynthesis history of the universe, as well as for his seminal contributions to the study of astrophysical thermonuclear explosions, nucleosynthesis, and the use of nuclear-decay chronometers to determine ages of stellar and terrestrial matter." He was awarded in 2021 the Hans A. Bethe Prize for "distinguished contributions across the breadth of nuclear astrophysics, Galactic chemical evolution and cosmochronology."

Upon his death he was survived by his widow, three daughters, four grandchildren, and one great-grandchild.

Selected publications

Articles

Books

References

1940 births
2022 deaths
American astrophysicists
20th-century American physicists
21st-century American physicists
Cornell University alumni
Yale Graduate School of Arts and Sciences alumni
Yeshiva University faculty
University of Illinois Urbana-Champaign faculty
University of Chicago faculty
Fellows of the American Physical Society
Fellows of the American Academy of Arts and Sciences